Novak Djokovic defeated Diego Schwartzman in the final, 7–5, 6–3 to win the men's singles tennis title at the 2020 Italian Open. It was his fifth Italian Open title and record 36th Masters 1000 title overall. Djokovic entered his 287th week as world No. 1 (surpassing Pete Sampras in second place) following the tournament.

Rafael Nadal was the two-time defending champion, but lost to Schwartzman in the quarterfinals.

Casper Ruud became the first Norwegian to reach a Masters 1000 semifinal, surpassing his father Christian Ruud, who reached the quarterfinals of Monte Carlo in 1997.

Seeds
The top eight seeds received a bye into the second round.

The players who also received a bye into the second round were as follows, corresponding each semifinalist from the US Open:
  Pablo Carreño Busta

The other seven byes were removed and therefore seven players were added into the main draw.

Draw

Finals

Top half

Section 1

Section 2

Bottom half

Section 3

Section 4

Qualifying

Seeds

Qualifiers

Lucky loser

Qualifying draw

First qualifier

Second qualifier

Third qualifier

Fourth qualifier

Fifth qualifier

Sixth qualifier

Seventh qualifier

Eighth qualifier

References
 Main draw
 Qualifying draw

Men's Singles